{{Speciesbox
| image = 
| image_caption = 
| taxon = Bosara linda
| authority = (Robinson, 1975)<ref>{{cite web |last=Yu |first=Dicky Sick Ki |url=http://www.taxapad.com/local.php?taxonidLC=82842946 |title=Bosara Walker 1866 |website=Home of Ichneumonoidea |publisher=Taxapad |archive-url=https://web.archive.org/web/20170813231140/http://www.taxapad.com/local.php?taxonidLC=82842946 |archive-date=13 August 2017 |accessdate=17 April 2013}}</ref>
| synonyms = *Chloroclystis linda Robinson, 1975
}}Bosara linda'' is a moth in the family Geometridae. It is found on Fiji.

References

Moths described in 1975
Eupitheciini
Moths of Fiji